Martin Mášik (born 8 January 1999) is a professional Slovak footballer who plays as a central midfielder for MFK Skalica in the Fortuna Liga.

Club career

MFK Skalica
Mášik made his professional Fortuna Liga debut for MFK Skalica on 30 July 2022 against AS Trenčín.

References

External links
 MFK Skalica official club profile 
 
 
 Futbalnet profile 

1999 births
Living people
Slovak footballers
Association football midfielders
MFK Skalica players
2. Liga (Slovakia) players
Slovak Super Liga players